Partido Popular Cristiano may refer to:

 Christian People's Party (Dominican Republic)
 Christian People's Party (Peru)